The following is a list of creeks named Fish Creek grouped by region and country.

Creeks
 Fish Creek (Western Australia)

Canada
 Fish Creek runs from Charlie Lake to the Beatton River near Fort St. John, British Columbia
 Fish Creek, Saskatchewan, northeast of Saskatoon and site of the Battle of Fish Creek

United States

Alaska
 Fish Creek, Anchorage, Alaska area
 Fish Creek, Bethel, Alaska area
 Fish Creek, Denali Borough, Alaska area
 Fish Creek, Juneau area
 Fish Creek, Ketchikan-Gateway area
 Fish Creek, Matanuska-Susitna area
 Fish Creek North Slope Borough area
 Fish Creek Prince of Wales-Outer Ketchikan area

Other states
 Fish Creek, Maricopa County; it runs west then northwest out of the Superstition Mountains
 Fish Creek, San Bernardino County
 Fish Creek, Routt County
 Fish Creek, in DeKalb County and Steuben County
 Fish Creek, Mitchell County Lat.: 43.22528; Long.: -92.68
 Fish Creek, Stillwater County, Montana
 Fish Creek, Niagara County, New York
 Fish Creek, Lewis County, New York and Oneida County, New York
 Fish Creek (Cape Fear River tributary), a stream in Harnett County, North Carolina
 Fish Creek, Williams County, Ohio
 Fish Creek, John Muir Wilderness, California
 Oregon:
 Fish Creek, Baker County, Oregon
 Fish Creek, Lincoln County, Oregon
 Fish Creek (Comb Wash), tributary to the Comb Wash, San Juan County, Utah
 Wyoming:
 Fish Creek, Carbon County
 Fish Creek, tributary to the Snake River, lowest point in Grand Teton National Park

See also
Fishkill (disambiguation), Dutch for Fish Creek